Diamonds for the Dictatorship of the Proletariat is a 1975 Soviet Estonian action film directed by Grigori Kromanov and based on the novel of the same name by Yulian Semyonov.

Plot
1921. Chekist Gleb Bokii received an encrypted message from Tallinn that there is an organization in Russia that is engaged in the theft of jewels from Gokhran and illegally smuggling them through the Baltic states to London and Paris. The investigation of the case is entrusted to a young employee of the Cheka Vsevolod Vladimirov.

Cast
 Vladimir Ivashov as Isayev
 Alexander Kaidanovsky as Vorontsov
 Yekaterina Vasilyeva as Anna Viktorovna
 Tatyana Samoylova as Maria  Olenetskaya 
 Margarita Terekhova as Vera, Vorontsov's ex-wife
 Edita Piekha as Lida Bosse (voiced by Svetlana Svetlichnaya)
 Alexander Porokhovshchikov as Osip Shelehes
 Armen Dzhigarkhanyan as Roman (Fyodor Shelehes)
 Lev Durov as Nikolay  Pozhamchi
 Vladimir Osenev as Stopansky
 Mikk Mikiver as Arthur  Neumann, chief of political intelligence in Estonia
 Algimantas Masiulis as Otto Nolmar
 Heino Mandri as Karl  Yurla
 Leonhard Merzin as Auguste
 Ants Eskola as Heino Marchand
 Arvo Pärt as pianist in a restaurant

References

External links
 
 Diamonds for the Dictatorship of the Proletariat, entry in Estonian Film Database (EFIS)

1975 films
Soviet-era Estonian films
Stierlitz
Films based on Russian novels
Soviet spy films
Films set in 1921
Tallinnfilm films
Films directed by Grigori Kromanov